Regenerator – Live 1982 is a live album by the British hard Rock band UFO, recorded live at the Hammersmith Odeon in London on 28 January 1982. It is the official issue of the bootleg UFO Landed London of the early 1990s, with the addition of the song "Mystery Train".

Track listing
"We Belong to the Night" (Neil Carter, Phil Mogg, Pete Way) – 4:22
"Let It Rain" (Carter, Mogg, Way) – 3:09
"Long Gone" (Paul Chapman, Mogg) – 5:02
"The Wild, the Willing and the Innocent" (Chapman, Mogg) – 4:51
"Only You Can Rock Me" (Mogg, Michael Schenker, Way) – 4:20
"No Place to Run" (Chapman, Mogg) – 5:02
"Love to Love" (Mogg, Schenker) – 8:43
"Doing It All for You" (Carter, Chapman, Mogg, Way) – 4:02
"Makin' Moves" (Chapman, Mogg) – 4:49
"Too Hot to Handle" (Mogg, Way) – 6:46
"Mystery Train" (Junior Parker, Sam Phillips) – 7:52
"Lights Out" (Mogg, Andy Parker, Schenker, Way) – 10:36

Personnel
 Phil Mogg – vocals
 Paul Chapman – guitars
 Neil Carter – keyboards, guitar, backing vocals
 Pete Way – bass
 Andy Parker – drums

References

2001 live albums
UFO (band) live albums
Albums recorded at the Hammersmith Apollo